Kensuke Tanaka (田中 賢介, born May 20, 1981) is a Japanese former professional baseball player. He has played for the Hokkaido Nippon-Ham Fighters of Nippon Professional Baseball and the San Francisco Giants of Major League Baseball.

Career

Hokkaido Nippon-Ham Fighters
Tanaka played for the Hokkaido Nippon-Ham Fighters from 2000 through 2012.

San Francisco Giants
He made his Major League debut with the Giants, in left field, on July 9, 2013, against the New York Mets despite playing almost exclusively second base with the Nippon Ham Fighters and the Giants' Triple-AAA affiliate, the Fresno Grizzlies.  He was designated for assignment on September 3, 2013, and released the next day.

Texas Rangers
He signed a minor league contract with the Texas Rangers on December 20, 2013, and was released on July 20, 2014.

Personal life
Tanaka is married to Japanese Sapporo TV reporter Chiho Nishimori (西森千芳).

References

External links

, or Retrosheet, or Baseball Reference (Minor, Japan and Winter Leagues),  or Register : Tanaka, Kensuke (Hokkaido Nippon-Ham Fighters), or Kensuke Tanaka - Yakyu Baka, or Official Blog 

1981 births
Bravos de Margarita players
Japanese expatriate baseball players in Venezuela
Fresno Grizzlies players
Hokkaido Nippon-Ham Fighters players
Japanese expatriate baseball players in the United States
Living people
Major League Baseball players from Japan
Nippon Ham Fighters players
Nippon Professional Baseball infielders
Round Rock Express players
San Francisco Giants players
Baseball people from Fukuoka Prefecture